William Michael Martin,  (born 22 November 2000) is an Australian Paralympic swimmer. He won three gold and one silver medals at the 2020 Summer Paralympics in Tokyo, breaking two world records and a Paralympic record in the process.

Personal
Martin was born on 22 November 2000. Martin's impairment is the result of a stroke he suffered in 2007. He has a vision impairment, and his hand also shakes due to a tremor. He was a learn-to-swim teacher at Nudgee College Swimming in Brisbane. As of 2021, he is undertaking an urban planning degree at the Queensland University of Technology.

Swimming career
Martin took up swimming after his stroke to help improve his movement. He is classified as an S9 swimmer. At the 2019 World Para Swimming Championships in London, he finished fifth in the Men's 100m butterfly (S10) and ninth in both the Men's 50m freestyle (S10) and Men's 100m freestyle (S10).

Martin broke his own world record with a time of 57.73 in the Men's 100m butterfly (S9) at the 2021 Australian Swimming Trials.

At the 2020 Summer Paralympics in Tokyo, Martin won the gold medal in the Men's 400 m freestyle S9 with a time of 4:10.25, a Paralympic record. He also won gold and set a new world record of 57.19 in the Men's 100 m butterfly S9. Martin won gold in the Men's 4×100 m freestyle 34 pts, along with Rowan Crothers, Matt Levy and Ben Popham, breaking the current World Record by almost 2 seconds. In the Men's 4x100m Medley 34 pts, he swam together with Timothy Disken, Timothy Hodge, and Ben Popham. His team won the silver medal in a time of 4:07.70, just over a second behind the winners, RPC, who set a new world record.

At the 2022 World Para Swimming Championships, Madeira, Martin won two medals - silver in the Men's 100 m Butterfly S9 and bronze in the Men's 100 m Freestyle S9  He did not win a medal in two other events.

At the 2022 Commonwealth Games in Birmingham, England, he finished 4th in the Men's 100 m butterfly S10.

Recognition
2020 - Paralympics Australia Rookie of the Year 
2021 - Swimming Australia Paralympic Program Swimmer of the Year
2022 – Medal of the Order of Australia for service to sport as a gold medallist at the 2020 Tokyo Paralympic Games

References

External links
 
 
 

2000 births
Living people
Male Paralympic swimmers of Australia
Medalists at the World Para Swimming Championships
Medalists at the 2020 Summer Paralympics
Paralympic gold medalists for Australia
Paralympic silver medalists for Australia
Paralympic medalists in swimming
Recipients of the Medal of the Order of Australia
Swimmers at the 2020 Summer Paralympics
Swimmers at the 2022 Commonwealth Games
Australian male freestyle swimmers
Australian male butterfly swimmers
S9-classified Paralympic swimmers
21st-century Australian people